Lajos Kovács (22 February 1936 – 8 November 1997) was a Hungarian middle-distance runner. He competed in the men's 800 metres at the 1960 Summer Olympics.

References

1936 births
1997 deaths
Athletes (track and field) at the 1960 Summer Olympics
Hungarian male middle-distance runners
Olympic athletes of Hungary
Place of birth missing
20th-century Hungarian people